Marc Caballé Naranjo (born 22 June 1991) is a Spanish footballer who plays for Atlético Sanluqueño CF as a defensive midfielder.

Club career
Born in L'Hospitalet de Llobregat, Barcelona, Catalonia, Caballé graduated with RCD Espanyol's youth setup, and made his debut as a senior with the reserves in the 2009–10 campaign, in Segunda División B. In the 2010 summer, he signed for Atlético Madrid and was assigned to the C-team in Tercera División.

On 14 July 2012, Caballé joined another reserve team, Atlético Malagueño, also in the fourth division. On 12 July of the following year, after appearing sparingly, he returned to Espanyol and its B-team.

In July 2014, Caballé suffered a serious knee injury and was sidelined for seven months, but still renewed his link until 2018. He was promoted to the main squad in La Liga on 3 June of the following year.

On 31 August 2015, Caballé was loaned to CD Lugo in a season-long deal. He made his professional debut on 15 October, starting in a 0–1 Copa del Rey away loss against SD Ponferradina.

On 29 January 2016, after being rarely used, Caballé was loaned to UE Cornellà until June. On 16 June, he rescinded his contract with the Pericos.

References

External links

1991 births
Living people
Footballers from L'Hospitalet de Llobregat
Spanish footballers
Association football midfielders
Segunda División players
Segunda División B players
Tercera División players
RCD Espanyol B footballers
Atlético Madrid C players
Atlético Malagueño players
RCD Espanyol footballers
CD Lugo players
UE Cornellà players
Recreativo de Huelva players
CF Rayo Majadahonda players
Atlético Sanluqueño CF players